Queridas amigas is a 1980 Argentine film directed by Carlos Orgambide.

Cast
 Dora Baret
 Luisina Brando
 Graciela Dufau
 Carlos Estrada
 Marcela López Rey
 Rodolfo Ranni
 Héctor Pellegrini
 Roberto Carnaghi
 Carlos De La Rosa
 Susana Latou
 Mario Luciani
 Ana María Giunta

References

External links
 

1980 films
Argentine drama films
1980s Spanish-language films
1980s Argentine films